Jonas Rasmussen (born 28 October 1977 in Aarhus) is a retired badminton player from Denmark.

Career
With his men's doubles partner Lars Paaske he won the 2003 IBF World Championships defeating Indonesian pair Candra Wijaya and Sigit Budiarto in the gold medal match and the All England Super Series 2010 defeating compatriots Mathias Boe and Carsten Mogensen. Rasmussen also competed in badminton at the 2004 Summer Olympics in men's doubles with Paaske. They had a bye in the first round, then were defeated in the round of 16 by Yim Bang-eun and Kim Yong-hyun of Korea.

He also competed in mixed doubles with partner Rikke Olsen.  They had a bye in the first round and defeated Daniel Shirley and Sara Petersen of New Zealand in the second.  In the quarterfinals, Rasmussen and Olsen beat Kim Dong-moon and Ra Kyung-min of Korea 17–14, 15–8 to advance to the semifinals.  There, they lost to Nathan Robertson and Gail Emms of Great Britain 15–6, 15–12.  In the bronze medal match, they were defeated by fellow Danish pair Jens Eriksen and Mette Schjoldager 15–5, 15–5 to finish fourth place.

He won the gold medal at the 2008 European Badminton Championships in men's doubles with Lars Paaske. With the retirement of Lars Paaske after the 2010 BWF World Championships in Paris, He is now pairing with another Danish player, Mads Conrad-Petersen.

Achievements

World Championships 
Men's doubles

IBF World Grand Prix 
The World Badminton Grand Prix sanctioned by International Badminton Federation (IBF) from 1983 to 2006.

Men's doubles

References

External links
 BWF Profile
Jonas Rasmussen's Profile - Badminton.dk

1977 births
Living people
Sportspeople from Aarhus
Danish male badminton players
Badminton players at the 2004 Summer Olympics
Badminton players at the 2008 Summer Olympics
Olympic badminton players of Denmark
World No. 1 badminton players